Nine Mile River is a small river in Wiltshire, England. The river is not nine miles long, and its name was derived because carters reckoned they were nine miles from Salisbury when they reached it. The river rises in the civil parish of Milston and joins the River Avon in the village of Bulford. At about halfway through its course, still in the parish of Milston, it is joined by the small Damson Brook.

References
 

Nine Mile River, Wiltshire
2NineMile